Anguispira alternata, common name the flamed disc or flamed tigersnail, is a species of air-breathing land snail, a terrestrial pulmonate gastropod mollusk in the family Discidae, the disk snails. Flamed discs are medium-sized snails, with shells ranging from 17 to 25 millimeters (0.67 to 0.98 inches) in diameter. They are found around logs, hollow trees, and rocks in wooded areas throughout eastern North America, ranging from New Brunswick, Canada, south to northern Florida, and west to northeastern Texas, Kansas and western Minnesota. Flamed disks are herbivores that feed on decaying plant material, fungi, and algae.

Parasites 
Parasites of Anguispira alternata include:
 Parelaphostrongylus tenuis
 Postharmostomum helicis

References 

Discidae
Molluscs of North America
Fauna of the Eastern United States
Fauna of the Great Lakes region (North America)
Gastropods described in 1816